Bab al-Nasr, is one of three remaining gates in the historic city wall of Cairo, the capital of Egypt. The gate's construction is dated to 1087 and was ordered by Badr al-Jamali, a Fatimid vizier. It is located at the northern end of Shari'a al-Gamaliya (al-Gamaliya Street) in the old city of Cairo and slightly east of another contemporary gate, Bab al-Futuh.

History 
The original Bab al-Nasr was built south of the present one by Fatimid general Jawhar as-Siqilli during the reign of the Fatimid caliph al-Mu'izz, when the city was first laid out in 969. Later, the vizier Badr al-Jamali, under Caliph al-Mustansir, enlarged the city and rebuilt the walls in the late 11th century. He replaced the first gate with the present one, naming it Bab al-'Izz ('Gate of Prosperity'). Despite this, the inhabitants have shown preference to the original name meaning "Gate of Victory", which has remained in use to this day. An inscription on the gate dates its construction to the year 1087 AD (480 AH).

Napoleon later named each tower of the north wall after the officers responsible for its security. The names of these French officers are carved near the upper level of the gates, like for example that of Thomas-Prosper Julien, aide-de-camp of Bonaparte in Egypt. The east tower is known as Tour Courbin and the west tower is known as Tour Julien.

Design 
It is a massive fortified gate with rectangular stone towers flanking the semicircular arch of the eastern portal. The gate and the surrounding wall were carefully designed for defense. Arrow slits allowed defenders to shoot projectiles at enemies below and projecting towers made it possible to deliver flanking fire as well. Inside the walls and towers were guard rooms and living quarters, connected by vaulted passages. The vaulted stone ceilings inside the gate were innovative in design, in particular the helicoidal vaults of the stairways, which are the oldest of their kind in this architectural context.
A significant decorative feature is the shields on the flanks and fronts of the protruding towers, which symbolize victory in protecting the city against invaders. A long horizontal Arabic inscription that runs across the facade of the gate, above the shield motifs, names Badr al-Jamali and his caliph, al-Mustansir, and also gives the date of construction. The bulk of the inscription praises Badr al-Jamali in particular. The full inscription, translated from Arabic, reads:

A rectangular inscription panel above the arch of the gate contains a Shi'a version of the Shahada, claiming Fatimid belief in Muhammad as prophet and Ali as imam. The full inscription reads:

See also
 Bab al-Futuh
 Bab Zuweila
 Gates of Cairo
 Jafar us Sadiq Bibliography
 List of Historic Monuments in Cairo

References

External links

 at Archnet.org 
 Images at Archnet

Buildings and structures in Cairo
Tourist attractions in Cairo
Gates of Cairo
Fatimid architecture in Cairo
Muizz Street
Historical Monuments in Cairo
Fatimid fortifications